Lithuanian Partisans Declaration of February 16, 1949 is a document, created by Lithuanian partisans and signed by Union of Lithuanian Freedom Fighters (ULFF) on February 16, 1949 in Minaičiai (Radviliškis District Municipality). By signing the declaration, the ULFF assumed responsibility to lead the restoration of independent democratic state of Lithuania, where equal rights for all citizens and social care is guaranteed. Document also states that "Communist party, as dictatorial and essentially opposite to the main aim of Lithuanian nation and keystone provision of the Constitution – independence of Lithuania, – is not considered a legal party". The declaration appeals to the Universal Declaration of Human Rights, Lithuanian Constitution of 1922 and addresses whole democratic world asking for help.

Historical background 
Lithuania was occupied by the Soviet Union in June 1940. The new Soviet regime began the process of forceful Sovietization – suppression of the opposition, nationalization of property, mass arrests of "enemies of the people", and deportation about 17,000 people during the June deportation. When Germany invaded the Soviet Union in June 1941, Lithuania came under the German control for about three years. In July–October 1944, as Red Army continued to push Germans westward in the Operation Bagration and Baltic Offensive, the Soviet Union occupied Lithuania again and reintroduced harsh Sovietization policies – drafting of men into the Red Army, arrests of anyone suspected of anti-Soviet attitudes, mass deportations to Siberia, nationalization of property, forced formation of collective farms, etc. Lithuanians formed the first armed resistance groups in summer 1944. The Lithuanian partisans, numbering about 30,000 at the end of 1945, organized themselves into units and districts. The process of consolidation continued and the ultimate goal was to establish a joint political and military authority of the armed resistance.

Meeting in Minaičiai 
In February 1949, meeting of partisan leaders took place in the bunker in Minaičiai (Radviliškis District Municipality). Eight partisans represented all the partisan units. During the first meeting, the name of the organization was approved—the Union of Lithuanian Freedom Fighters and the leadership was formed unanimously. Žemaitis-Vytautas became the Chairman of the Presidium of the Union's Council (posthumously he was awarded the rank of Brigade General), Šibaila-Merainis was appointed the Head of the Union's public affairs, and Liesys-Naktis was named the Head of the Union's Public Relations Department. The resolutions mentioned in the minutes of the meetings foresaw the organizational structure of the movement and leadership, the tactics of activities, relations within the organization and with local people. Union's political program was presented by its author Šibaila-Merainis. The program, which consisted of 12 articles, stressed that the ultimate goal of the fight was the restoration of the Lithuanian Parliamentary Republic of 1920–1926.

On the occasion of the anniversary of the February 16 independence of Lithuania, the Council signed the political declaration. It stated that the Council of the Union of Lithuanian Freedom Fighters was the highest political body of the nation. Together with other documents passed at the meeting, the Declaration provided the legal and political basis for the Lithuanian armed resistance, ensured a new format of freedom fighting, and legitimized the Union as an organized armed resistance to the Soviet occupation and its council as the sole legitimate authority in the territory of the occupied country. The participants also adopted the motto of the movement: “Atiduok Tėvynei, ką privalai” [Give the Homeland What You Must Give!].

It was the only general meeting of the leaders. As the situation in the country had worsened, the number of supporters of the resistance movement had diminished. It became increasingly difficult to get in touch not only with the area headquarters but also groups of partisans in the vicinity. More and more partisans were killed or arrested.

Signatories of the declaration 
Of the eight signatories, half of them were teachers. Two were students, one officer and one accountant.

Legacy 
The declaration signed in Minaičiai is recognized as a legal act of Lithuania. On January 12, 1999, Seimas (parliament of Lithuania) passed a decree stating that the Union of Lithuanian Freedom Fighters united military units and social groups, was led by unanimous leadership, engaged in resistance using military means, and fought for the liberation of Lithuania. It was recognized that the Council of the Union, which signed the Declaration of 1944, exercised functions of the highest political and military structure and was the only legitimate authority in the territory of the occupied country.

On the basis of the February 16 Declaration, Seimas passed a resolution on March 12, 2009 affirming that from February 16, 1949 until his death on May 30, 1953, Jonas Žemaitis-Vytautas was “the head of state of Lithuania fighting against the occupation, who actually performed the duties of the President of the Republic of Lithuania.” On November 20, 2018, Seimas passed a resolution declaring that after the death of Žemaitis-Vytautas, Adolfas Ramanauskas-Vanagas became the President of the fighting Lithuania.

On November 22, 2010 a monument by sculptor Jonas Jagėla dedicated to the declaration and its signatories was unveiled in the village of Minaičiai. In 2012, the bunker was restored at the Minaičiai-Pėtrėčiai homestead and the exposition “Atiduok Tėvynei, ką privalai” was installed. In May 2019, the partisan bunker was reproduced at the Center for Civil Education and an exhibition dedicated to the 70th anniversary of the Declaration, “19490216: Apsisprendimo šifras” [19490216: The Code of Self-Determination] was opened.

Every year on February 16, a commemoration in the village of Minaičiai takes place.

On February 14, 2020, one more original copy of the Declaration was found, while looking through recently received new documents of Lithuanian freedom fighters.

Literature 
 Auksutė Ramanauskaitė-Skokauskienė. Laisvės deklaracija ir jos signatarai – Kaunas: Naujasis lankas, 2009. – 56 p.: iliustr. – 
 Partizanų bunkeryje gimusi deklaracija // Kauno diena, 2009-02-07

References

1949 in Lithuania
1949 in law
Resistance in Lithuania
Lithuanian Soviet Socialist Republic
1949 documents
Declarations of independence
February 1949 events in Europe
Cold War rebellions